Stolokrosuchus is an extinct genus of neosuchian crocodylomorph that lived during the Early Cretaceous.  Its fossils, including a skull with a long thin snout and bony knobs on the prefrontal, have been found in Niger.  Stolokrosuchus was described in 2000 by Hans Larsson and Boubacar Gado.  The type species is S. lapparenti.  They initially described it as related to Peirosauridae, if not a member of that family. One study has shown it to be related to Elosuchus. However, more recent works usually find Stolokrosuchus to be one of the basalmost neosuchian, only distantly related to the elosuchid or pholidosaurid, Elosuchus. It was a semiaquatic crocodylomorph.

Phylogeny
The cladogram following by Nicholl et al. 2021:

References

Early Cretaceous crocodylomorphs of Africa
Notosuchians
Prehistoric pseudosuchian genera